Ordo Aurum Solis ("Order of the Gold of the Sun") is a Hermetic and Theurgic order founded in England in 1897 by George Stanton and Charles Kingold. It is a vehicle of the Ogdoadic Tradition, itself an important element of the Western Mystery Tradition. Ordo Aurum Solis is best known through the published works of two of its past Grand Masters Melita Denning and Osborne Phillips. The husband and wife team together authored many books (some reappearing in newer editions) that cover different aspects of psychic and spiritual practices, such as the Llewellyn Practical Guide to Astral Projection and Llewellyn Practical Guide to Creative Visualization, as well as their seminal work (reprinted in three volumes) outlining the philosophy and practices of Ordo Aurum Solis: The Magical Philosophy.

Despite a few similarities to the Hermetic Order of the Golden Dawn, some of its descendants, various Thelemic orders, and other groups stemming from the Rosicrucian revival of the 19th century, Ordo Aurum Solis represents a distinct and unique system of magical philosophy and practice based on the Ogdoadic Tradition

Ogdoadic Tradition
The Ogdoadic Tradition stems from the Mediterranean mystery religions of ancient Greece as well as the Theurgic practices of the priesthoods of Ptolemaic Egypt. Its signature symbol is the Eight-pointed Star of Regeneration, an emblem signifying the Regeneration of the Soul and Divine Inspiration. Its philosophy and practices appear in the works of early Hermeticists and the teachings of the Neoplatonic schools of Alexandria, Apamea, and Athens in Late Antiquity. According to its initiates, the father-figure of the Tradition is Hermes Trismegistus.

The symbols and philosophy of the Ogdoadic Tradition were also expressed in Byzantine art. The Ogdoadic Tradition, as mentioned in The Foundations of High Magick (The Magical Philosophy, vol. 1) by Melita Denning and Osborne Phillips, made itself evident in the frescos painted by Giotto (1270-1337) and was also incorporated into the construction of the Baptistery at Florence.

Initiatory structure

The initiatory structure of Ordo Aurum Solis consists of three "Halls", preceded by a special training in the Circle of the Pronaos. The three grades associated with the Halls of the Order are as follows:

 Neophytos, or Apprentice of the Great Work
 Servitor, or Servitor of the Secret Flame
 Adeptus Minor, or Priest of the Gnosis

History

Birth of the Golden Chain

Various initiatic traditions existed in ancient Greece. These were called Mysteries. In Greece the Mysteries of Eleusis, Samothrace, Orpheus, and Dionysus were among the most important, and in ancient Rome and across its empire, the Mithraic and Isiac Traditions. These effectively combined the sacred Mysteries with the rationalism of Philosophy, which constituted the real genius of such esoteric traditions.

Greek initiates were strongly present in Alexandria, in the latest period of Egyptian history known as the Ptolemaic period. They brought with them the Greek initiatic system of the Mysteries, which was then incorporated by the ancient Egyptian priests into their traditions, thereby giving a new, coherent structure to the same. According to Ordo Aurum Solis and its initiates, this was the real birth of the Hermetic Theurgic Tradition, later to be known as the Ogdoadic Tradition, or Ordo Aurum Solis. As Sumerian and Egyptian magic also found their place in the clear system of the ancient Greek Mysteries, the Western initiatic tradition was born.

Rebirth of the Order
Just before the dawn of the 20th century, there were a number of "antiquarian" and "folklore" societies in England that chronicled curiosities and pursued their own chosen researches. One such society was known as the Societas Rotae Fulgentis (i.e., “Society of the Blazing Wheel”) and had been slowly amassing a wealth of knowledge and research from its various antecedents in the Ogdoadic Tradition.
To this society belonged two dedicated occultists, Charles Kingold and George Stanton. In the changing religious and political environment of the late 19th century, they decided to take the core philosophy of the Societas Rotae Fulgentis and constitute it into a living magical and initiatory order, establishing Ordo Aurum Solis in 1897 and reawakening the Golden Chain of the Greek and Egyptian initiatic heritage.

Denning and Phillips
Melita Denning and Osborne Phillips are the pen-names of Vivian Godfrey and Leon Barcynski, who together authored many books in the early days of Llewellyn Publications. Chief among these was the formal presentation of the Order Aurum Solis' philosophy and praxis: The Magical Philosophy.
 
Melita Denning, a Jungian scholar, was the first female Grand Master of the Order. She led the Order from 1976 to 1987, and from 1988 till her death on 23 March 1997. Earlier in her life, she had traveled throughout the Middle East and the Mediterranean in search of occult knowledge. It was after six years of research that she finally came upon Ordo Aurum Solis.

Osborne Phillips was Grand Master of the Order from 1997 to 2003. He received magical training early in his life at the hands of Ernest Page, a London astrologer of some repute. In the early 1970s, he was in charge of psychic investigation as conducted by certain initiates of Ordo Aurum Solis. Phillips was also a student of U Maung Maung Ji, who specialized in Eastern philosophical systems and was a co-worker of the UN Secretary-General U Thant.

Carl Llewellyn Weschcke
7th Grand Master of the Aurum Solis, Carl Llewellyn Weschcke was also the chairman of Llewellyn Worldwide, Ltd. until his death in 2015. He wrote several books on psychic empowerment and published, through Llewellyn, books of the Ordo Aurum Solis. Weschcke reaffirmed his support to the Hermetic Tradition in the foreword to Jean-Louis de Biasi's The Divine Arcana of the Aurum Solis.

Jean-Louis de Biasi (Lifetime Grand Master)
Jean-Louis de Biasi, an author and philosopher born in Southern France, has been involved in the Mystery Traditions for the past forty years. He has been Grand Master of Ordo Aurum Solis since 2003, as shown on the Order Aurum Solis' website. De Biasi has written books on the Ogdoadic Tradition , the Tarot, the aura, and Freemasonry. As per his website, he is now actively writing books in English mainly published by Llewellyn Publications. He wrote Secrets and Practices of the Freemasons: Sacred Mysteries, Rituals and Symbols Revealed and has written two books directly related to Ordo Aurum Solis: The Divine Arcana of the Aurum Solis and Rediscover the Magick of the Gods and Goddesses. His book, The Magical Use of Prayer Beads, contains practices coming from the Aurum Solis. All these books have been published by Llewellyn Publications.

The Order today
Vivian Godfrey (Melita Denning) was diagnosed with cancer early in 1997 and died on 23 March that year.

On 14 June 2003 Leon Barcynski (Osborne Phillips) retired as Grand Master and was succeeded by Jean-Louis de Biasi, the current Grand Master, who subsequently made a declaration that bore witness to the Hermetic nature of the work of the Order.

This "Aurum Solis - Mediterranean Yoga" order is present on several continents and claims to maintain a direct lineage through 120 years of existence. The current Grand Master Jean-Louis de Biasi continues to maintain the high moral standards of this tradition and its original system of teachings with countless unpublished material that is provided to its members. This organization is registered as tax exempt under Internal Revenue Code Section 501(c)(3). The practice of the eight rays of the tradition as a way of life has been highlighted in the past years and seems an obvious continuation of this tradition.

See also
Magical organization

References

External links
"Grand Master" Jean-Louis de Biasi's website
"Aurum Solis - Mediterranean Yoga" website

Magical organizations
Hermeticism
1897 establishments in the United Kingdom